Pont Aven School of Contemporary Art (PASCA) was an art school in Pont Aven France, founded in 1993 by art historian Caroline Boyle-Turner as an international fine arts program for advanced under-graduate and post-graduate studies. It was a private, United States non-profit university fully accredited for undergraduate study through its affiliation with Pacific Northwest College of Art in Portland, Oregon.  In 2011, the school closed its doors.

Junior year, undergraduate coursework delivered during the 15-week/15-credit study abroad semester at PASCA was accredited through Pacific Northwest College of Art in Portland, Oregon. Courses satisfied National Association of Schools of Art and Design requirements for 300 level studio, art history/critical studies and French culture and language classes.

Each term the curriculum had these potential course options:

• A 2-D studio (can include painting, drawing, print) 
• A 3-D studio (can include sculpture, installation, site work) 
• A 4-D studio (time-based strategies that may include video, performance, photo, digital) 
• An Art History/Critical Studies offering 
• French Culture and Language study 
• Two five-day faculty-led cultural site seminars, to Paris/Berlin and either Venice in Biennale years, or Madrid/Barcelona, or London ].

A shorter summer session was available as well. The campus included studios, exhibition spaces, IT labs, and libraries. Students visited the contemporary art scenes of Paris, London and Berlin.

The art school was located in the small town of Pont-Aven in Brittany, France - since the 19th century one of the favorite summer working places of Paris-based artists and art students like Paul Gauguin, Paul Sérusier, Émile Bernard, as well as Maurice de Vlaminck and Camille Claudel. Since these heroic days, Pont-Aven School became a brand covering a broad variety of artists busy in the region.

In partnership with CIAC-Pont Aven, the school hosted and sponsored a wide range of contemporary art exhibits, solo, duo, and group exhibitions by an international cohort of professional artists.   Notable artists included, Dawn Clements, Bruce Stiglich, Wendy Edwards, Melissa Ferreira, Nana Gregory, Sam Walsh, David Eckard, John K Melvin and his Aven Project, Gilles Mahé, Nancy Macko, Fred of the Wood, Dagmar Hemmerich, Cristina de Melo, Milena Martinovic, Nik Vlahos, Robin Hill, and many more artists spanning 18 years of operation.

18 years of student enrollment also produced end-of-semester group art exhibitions, where between 10 to 20 students per semester showed work, every 5 to 15 weeks of every year.

External links
PASCA website 
 www.artschools-europe.org

Art schools in France
Educational institutions established in 1993
Education in France
1993 establishments in France